The National Tutoring Programme is a UK Government scheme announced in June 2020 and launched in November that year forming part of a £1.7 billion catch-up fund to try to address learning loss during the COVID-19 pandemic. It outsources the tutoring of school children to 33 organisations, most of them private companies. The scheme has attracted criticism over cost, claimed inefficiency, and over the use of children as tutors.

Background 

During the COVID-19 pandemic, schools in the UK had periods of closure and some teaching was done purely online. The government allocated funds to help disadvantaged students aged 5 to 16 catch up their lost learning. Initially in 2020 a billion pounds were allocated, including 350 million for the National Tutoring Programme to spend for a year. Later announcements extended this to two years and pledged an additional 700 million, 200 million of which was for the NTP.

Providers 
The scheme has published a list of approved providers, including private companies such as Pearson plc and Randstad Education as well as public bodies including the University of Sunderland, which trains and employs graduates to teach at school level. Of the 32 approved providers, 11 are non-profit entities. Schools choose which provider to use and buy the tuition at a subsidised price. Initially this means that schools pay one quarter of the full cost, though the government announced in early 2021 that the proportion of subsidy would increase in subsequent years, with schools paying 50% of the cost in the 2022–23 academic year and 90% the year after that.

Costs 
An investigation by The Observer found that providers are charging the government much more than was being paid to the tutors. One such provider was being paid up to £84 per hour, while its least experienced tutoring jobs were advertised at £15 per hour. Another provider pays tutors between 20 and 30 pounds per hour of tuition, while charging 80 per hour. The NTP defended the sums paid to providers, saying that the money not paid to tutors funds training, quality assurance, technology, and administration. The leader of the Association of School and College Leaders said that the way the money is being distributed "may decrease its effectiveness", and that it would be better to give the money directly to schools and colleges. Richard Adams, education editor of The Guardian, has argued that the scheme would be more effective if the schools received the money directly.

Use of children as tutors 
It was revealed in March 2021 that one of the providers, Third Space Learning (TSL), used Sri Lankan undergraduates as tutors, whose minimum age requirement was 17. TSL is one of the most-used providers in the scheme, providing tuition to 800 schools. TSL had claimed that its tutors were all STEM graduates, but its recruitment process required applicants to be "skilled in maths and English" and to pass an online test. Their tutors were paid an average of £3.07 an hour (a minimum of £1.57 per hour). In response to the revelations, TSL suspended the use of tutors under 17 and the Department of Education pledged to review the use of overseas tutors.

Mary Bousted, joint general secretary of the National Education Union, said:

Enrolment 
There is a wide variation in enrolment in the scheme across the UK. The target is to reach 6,000 schools across the nine UK regions. The scheme has reached 100% of its target number of schools enrolled in the South-West and 96.1% in the South-East, compared to 59.3% in the North-West, 58.8% in the North-East, and 58.9% in Yorkshire and the Humber.

References

External links 
 

Education finance in the United Kingdom
Government spending in the United Kingdom
Government procurement in the United Kingdom
Public education in the United Kingdom
National responses to the COVID-19 pandemic
COVID-19 pandemic in the United Kingdom
2021 in British politics
2020 in British politics